Salem North or 'Salem (North)' is one of the 234 assembly constituencies in the state of Tamil Nadu in southern India. Its State Assembly Constituency number is 89. It was created in 2008 when the previous constituencies Salem I and Salem II, were redrawn as Salem North, Salem South and Salem West. It is also a part of Salem Lok Sabha constituency.

Salem North was one of the 17 assembly constituencies to have VVPAT facility with EVMs in 2016 Tamil Nadu Legislative Assembly election.

Salem North consists of:

Salem Municipal Corporation Wards - No.6 to 16 and 26 to 36
Kannankurichi (Town Panchayat)

Members of Legislative Assembly

Election results

2021

2016

2011

References 

 

Assembly constituencies of Tamil Nadu
Salem, Tamil Nadu
Government of Salem, Tamil Nadu